A cookie press is a device for making pressed cookies such as spritzgebäck. It consists of a cylinder with a plunger on one end, which is used to extrude cookie dough through a small hole at the other end. Typically the cookie press has interchangeable perforated plates with holes in different shapes, such as a star shape or a narrow slit to extrude the dough in ribbons.

References

Food preparation utensils